The 2005 ARAG World Team Cup was a tennis tournament play on outdoor clay courts. It was the 27th edition of the World Team Cup, and was part of the 2005 ATP Tour. It took place at the Rochusclub in Düsseldorf, Germany, from 15 May through 21 May 2005.

Chile were the two time defending champions, but they failed to advance beyond the group stage. Germany won the title, defeating Argentina in the final, by two rubbers to one.

Squads

Blue group

Tommy Haas (# 22)
Nicolas Kiefer (# 29)
Florian Mayer (# 54)
Alexander Waske (# 51 Doubles)

David Ferrer (# 20)
Álex López Morón (# 94 Doubles)
Tommy Robredo (# 16)
Santiago Ventura (# 71)

Jonas Björkman (# 1 Doubles)
Joachim Johansson (# 12)
Thomas Johansson (# 20)

Bob Bryan (# 5 Doubles)
Mike Bryan (# 5 Doubles)
Jeff Morrison (# 111)
Vince Spadea (# 43)

Red group

Guillermo Cañas (# 10)
Juan Ignacio Chela (# 33)
Guillermo Coria (# 9)
Gastón Gaudio (# 6)

Adrián García (# 183)
Hermes Gamonal (# 258 Doubles)
Fernando González (# 26)
Nicolás Massú (# 23)

Tomáš Berdych (# 46)
Jiří Novák (# 27)

Arnaud Clément (# 61 Doubles)
Sébastien Grosjean (# 24)
Michaël Llodra (# 9 Doubles)

 Rankings are as of May 16, 2005.

Round robin

Blue group

Standings

Germany vs. United States

Spain vs. Sweden

Germany vs. Sweden

Spain vs. United States

Germany vs. Spain

Sweden vs. United States

Red group

Standings

Chile vs. Czech Republic

Argentina vs. France

Chile vs. France

Argentina vs. Czech Republic

Argentina vs. Chile

Czech Republic vs. France

Final

Argentina vs. Germany

References

World Team Cup
World Team Cup, 2005
World Team Cup